George Napolitano is a photographer who specializes in professional wrestling photography.

He was a very close friend of Road Warrior Hawk and the Anoa'i family.

Awards
 George Tragos/Lou Thesz Professional Wrestling Hall of Fame
Jim Melby Award (2013)
Professional Wrestling Hall of Fame
Class of 2017
Pro Wrestling Illustrated
Stanley Weston Award (2022)

References

American photographers
Living people
Professional Wrestling Hall of Fame and Museum
Year of birth missing (living people)